The 1983 Milan–San Remo was the 74th edition of the Milan–San Remo cycle race and was held on 19 March 1983. The race started in Milan and finished in San Remo. The race was won by Giuseppe Saronni of the Del Tongo team.

General classification

References

1983
March 1983 sports events in Europe
1983 in road cycling
1983 in Italian sport
1983 Super Prestige Pernod